Hostile City Showdown was a professional wrestling supercard event produced by Extreme Championship Wrestling (ECW) annually from 1994 to 1999.

Dates and venues

 
Recurring events established in 1994
Recurring events disestablished in 1999
1994 establishments in Pennsylvania
1999 disestablishments in Pennsylvania